Tu Guangming (born 1 February 1960) is a Chinese sailor. He competed in the Finn event at the 1984 Summer Olympics.

References

External links
 

1960 births
Living people
Chinese male sailors (sport)
Olympic sailors of China
Sailors at the 1984 Summer Olympics – Finn
Place of birth missing (living people)